The men's 20 kilometres walk event at the 1997 Summer Universiade was held on the streets of Catania, Italy, on 31 August.

Results

References

Athletics at the 1997 Summer Universiade
1997